Iain Woolward (born 14 March 1949) is a British sailor. He competed in the Star event at the 1984 Summer Olympics.

References

External links
 

1949 births
Living people
British male sailors (sport)
Olympic sailors of Great Britain
Sailors at the 1984 Summer Olympics – Star
Sportspeople from Edinburgh